"Never Say Never" is a song recorded by American country music artist T. Graham Brown.  It was released in April 1989 as the third single from the album Come as You Were.  The song reached #30 on the Billboard Hot Country Singles & Tracks chart.  The song was written by Walt Aldridge and Tom Brasfield

Critical reception
A review at mykindofcountry.wordpress.com said the song was a rather shouty blues rock style number that has little to do with country music and sounds very dated today.

Chart performance

References

1989 singles
1988 songs
T. Graham Brown songs
Songs written by Walt Aldridge
Songs written by Tom Brasfield
Song recordings produced by Ron Chancey
Capitol Records Nashville singles